Alton Heights Junction railway station was a short-lived station located  south of Lesmahagow in the Scottish county of South Lanarkshire.

History

Opened by the Caledonian Railway, the station was not advertised in the public timetables and was intended solely for the use of workmen, probably those employed by the company in the sidings constructed south-east of the junction at the end of the 19th century.  These sidings were used for marshalling and weighing wagons of coal from the several collieries in the Douglas and Coalburn areas.  The Caledonian Railway became part of the London, Midland and Scottish Railway during the Grouping of 1923. This company then closed the station after roads were improved and more convenient local bus services became available.  However, the junction signal box and the lines past it continued to operate until dates in the 1950s and 1960s.

References

External links
 RAILSCOT on Coalburn Branch

Former Caledonian Railway stations
Disused railway stations in South Lanarkshire
Railway stations in Great Britain opened in 1893
Railway stations in Great Britain closed in 1926
1893 establishments in Scotland
1926 disestablishments in Scotland